Ralph Schwarz (28 March 1967 – 17 September 1992) was a Dutch rower. He competed in the men's coxless four event at the 1988 Summer Olympics. Schwarz died in a plane crash in 1992. He was Sven Schwarz's brother and Bram Schwarz's uncle.

References

External links
 

1967 births
1992 deaths
Dutch male rowers
Olympic rowers of the Netherlands
Rowers at the 1988 Summer Olympics
People from Nieuwkoop
Victims of aviation accidents or incidents in 1992
Victims of aviation accidents or incidents in the United States
Sportspeople from South Holland
20th-century Dutch people